Chloroclystis spissidentata is a moth in the family Geometridae. It was described by William Warren in 1893. It is found in Sikkim, India.

Adults are fuscous, thickly speckled with small ochreous white spots. There are numerous indistinct waved lines on the wings.

References

External links

Moths described in 1893
spissidentata